The following lists events that happened during 1974 in Ethiopia.

Incumbents
 Emperor: Haile Selassie I (until 12 September), Amha Selassie (starting 12 September)
 Prime Minister:  
 until 1 March: Aklilu Habte-Wold 
 1 March-22 July: Endelkachew Makonnen
 22 July-3 August: vacant
 3 August-12 September: Mikael Imru
 starting 12 September: post abolished

Events

Ethiopian Revolution

 12 January – the Ethiopian Revolution begun when Ethiopian soldiers rebelled in Negele Borana.
 18 February – Nationwide protests surged in Addis Ababa by students, teachers, workers, taxi drivers and white collar workers.
28 April – by order of Haile Selassie asked Prime Minister Aklilu Habte-Wold to resign from office and instead installed liberal aristocrat Endelkachew Mekonnen as the new Prime Minister.
 June – the Coordinating Committee of the Armed Forces, also known as the Derg, established to seize the power of the emperor.
 22 July – Endalkachew resigned replaced by Mikael Imru, a progressive aristocrat.
 1 August – Endalkachew was arrested by the Derg.
 12 September – Coup d'état of Haile Selassie resulted his imprisonment at National Palace in Addis Ababa, stayed until his death on 27 August 1975.

Deaths 
 23 November -
 Aklilu Habte-Wold
 Akale Work Hapte-Wold
 Aman Mikael Andom
 Endelkachew Makonnen

References

 
Ethiopia
1970s in Ethiopia
Ethiopia
Years of the 20th century in Ethiopia